The Middleborough Main Post Office is a historic post office building in Middleborough, Massachusetts.  The single-story brick and stone building was erected in 1933 as part of a Works Progress Administration jobs program.  The building has neo-Classical style, with a projecting entry pavilion, and windows slightly recessed in round arch openings.

The building was listed on the National Register of Historic Places in 1987, and included in the Middleborough Center Historic District in 2000.

See also 

National Register of Historic Places listings in Plymouth County, Massachusetts
List of United States post offices

References 

Middleborough, Massachusetts
Middleborough
Buildings and structures in Plymouth County, Massachusetts
National Register of Historic Places in Plymouth County, Massachusetts
Historic district contributing properties in Massachusetts